Cotai is a  piece of newly reclaimed land on top of Seac Pai Bay between Taipa and Coloane islands in Macau, that has made two independent islands become one island, since 2005. The word (a portmanteau of Coloane and Taipa) can also refer to the entire new island which was formed by the reclamation. In the second sense, the Special Administrative Region of Macau now consists of the Macau Peninsula plus Cotai Island, about a mile to the south.

Cotai was created to provide Macau with a new gambling and tourism area since Macau is so densely populated and land is scarce, and many hotels and casinos can be found there now. In 2006, a new hospital was founded in the Cotai area, the MUST Hospital, which is associated with the Macau University of Science and Technology Foundation.

History
In 1968, a causeway (Estrada do Istmo) connecting Taipa and Coloane was inaugurated. Throughout the 90s, a series of landfill works expanded this isthmus, and after the 1999 transfer of sovereignty over Macau from Portugal to China, further landfills began to expand this small isthmus further.

Hotels and casinos

The "Cotai Strip" is a name dubbed to the entire hotel-casino area, where the term "Cotai Strip" has been trademarked by Las Vegas Sands Corporation, which coined the phrase (USPTO Registration Nos. 4396486 and 4396486 for gaming and hotel services), and only applies to its properties.

Galaxy Entertainment Group's Grand Waldo Hotel was the first casino to commence operations in Cotai, opening its doors in May, 2006. The construction of many other casino and hotel projects is currently underway. The largest and most notable property on Cotai so far is Las Vegas Sands' Venetian Macao, which opened its doors on August 28, 2007. Melco PBL Holdings opened the City of Dreams directly across the street from the Venetian on June 1, 2009.

As of August 2021, several new hotel-casinos have opened in Cotai, with several more scheduled to fully open in the next few years including the Grand Lisboa Palace and the Lisboeta Macau.

List of hotels and casinos
 Four Seasons Hotel Macao
 Broadway Macau
 City of Dreams
 Galaxy Macau
 Grand Lisboa Palace
 Lisboeta Macau
 MGM Cotai
 Pousada Marina Infante
 Studio City Macau
The Londoner Macao
 The Parisian Macao
 The Plaza Macao
 The Venetian Macao
 Wynn Palace

Tourist attractions
 Macau East Asian Games Dome

Transportation

 Cotai Jet – high speed catamaran owned by The Venetian Macao, operating ferry services between Taipa Ferry Terminal and Hong Kong–Macau Ferry Terminal, Hong Kong
 Macau Light Rapid Transit - a mass transit system in Macau that began partial operations in 2019.  Planned expansions will serve the Macau Peninsula, Taipa and Cotai, serving major border checkpoints such as the Border Gate, the Outer Harbour Ferry Terminal, the Lotus Bridge Border and the Macau International Airport. The Ocean-to-Taipa-Ferry-Terminal line began operations in late 2019.

Gallery

See also
Gambling in Macau
One Oasis

Footnotes

External links

 
Populated coastal places in Macau
Concelho das Ilhas